Sultan Mahmud Al-Muktafi Billah Shah Al-Haj ibni Almarhum Sultan Ismail Nasiruddin Shah Al-Haj  (29 April 1930 – 14 May 1998) was the 17th Sultan of Terengganu from 21 September 1979 to 14 May 1998.

Life
Sultan Mahmud was born on 29 April 1930 in Kuala Terengganu. He was married to Sharifah Nong Fatima As-Saggoff binti Sayyid Abdullah As-Saggoff and Tengku Ampuan Bariah binti Almarhum Sultan Sir Hisamuddin Alam Shah, sister of late Sultan Selangor, Almarhum Sultan Salahuddin Abdul Aziz Shah in 1951. He was a cousin to the late Almarhum Sultan Salahuddin Abdul Aziz Shah of Selangor.

Twenty eight years later, his father Sultan Ismail Nasiruddin Shah died in 1979. He was installed as the Sultan of Terengganu in 1981 and Tengku Ampuan Bariah became Tengku Ampuan Besar of Terengganu.

Sultan Mahmud was the colonel for the Royal Armoured Corps (KAD) from 1979 until 1998.

He was a close friend of his advisor Tan Sri Wan Mokhtar Ahmad, the former Menteri Besar (chief minister) of Terengganu from 1974 to 1999. His main goal was to make Terengganu a developed state. Major state projects and developments under his reign including Petronas Petroleum Complex in Kerteh, Sultan Ismail Power Station at Paka the largest power station in Malaysia, Kenyir Dam, Sultan Mahmud Bridge, the bridge linking Kuala Terengganu to Pulau Duyong and Kuala Nerus, Wisma Darul Iman and Tengku Tengah Zaharah Mosque (Floating Mosque).

He performed the hajj pilgrimage with his cousin Almarhum Sultan Salahuddin of Selangor in 1984.

Death
On 14 May 1998, he died in Mount Elizabeth Hospital, Singapore and was replaced by his son Sultan Mizan Zainal Abidin. His body was laid to rest in the new Royal Mausoleum near Al-Muktafi Billah Shah Mosque in Kuala Terengganu. He was the first sultan of Terengganu to be buried here.

Honours
He was awarded:

Honours of Terengganu 
 Supreme Royal Family Order of Terengganu : Founding Grand Master and Member (DKT, 10 March 1981 - 15 May 1998)
 Family Order of Terengganu  : First Class (DK I, 26 June 1964) and Grand Master (21 Sept. 1979 - 15 May 1998)
 Order of Sultan Mahmud I of Terengganu : Founding Grand Master and Member Grand Companion (SSMT, 28 Feb. 1982 - 15 May 1998)
 Order of the Crown of Terengganu : Knight Grand Commander (SPMT, 26 June 1977) and Grand Master (21 Sept. 1979 - 15 May 1998)

Honours of Malaysia 
  :
 Recipient of Order of the Crown of the Realm (DMN) (1981)
  :
 First Class of the Royal Family Order of Johor (DK I) (8 April 1986)
  :
 Member of the Royal Family Order of Kedah (DK) 
  :
 Member of the Royal Family Order of Kelantan (DK) (30 March 2002) 
  :
 Member of the Royal Family Order of Negeri Sembilan (DKNS) (19 July 2001)
  :
 Member 1st class of the Family Order of the Crown of Indra of Pahang (DK I) (1981)
  : 
 Member of the Royal Family Order of Perak (DK) (17 December 1977)
 Grand Knight of the Order of Cura Si Manja Kini (SPCM) (17 December 1977)
  :
 Recipient of Perlis Family Order of the Gallant Prince Syed Putra Jamalullail (DK)
  :
 Second class of the Royal Family Order of Selangor (DK II) (8 March 1978)
  : 
 Knight Grand Commander of the Order of the Star of Hornbill Sarawak (DP) 
 Order of Meritorious Service to Sarawak (DJBS)

Foreign Honours 
  : Royal Family Order of the Crown of Brunei (DKMB)
  : 
 Knight of Justice or Grace of the Order of the Hospital of St. John of Jerusalem (KStJ, 20 March 1990)
 Queen Elizabeth II Coronation Medal (2 June 1953)

Legacy
Several projects and institutions were named after the Sultan, including:

Educational institutions

Sekolah Menengah Sains Sultan Mahmud (SESMA) at Wakaf Tembusu, Kuala Terengganu

Buildings, Bridges and Roads

Sultan Mahmud Al-Muktafi Billah Shah Mosque at Bandar Al-Muktafi Billah Shah
Al-Muktafi Billah Shah Mosque at Kuala Terengganu
Sultan Mahmud Bridge at Jalan Tengku Mizan on Federal Route 65 at Kuala Terengganu
Jalan Sultan Mahmud on Federal Route 174 at Kuala Terengganu
Sultan Mahmud Airport at Seberang Takir, Kuala Terengganu
Sultan Mahmud Power Station, Kenyir Dam

Others

Bandar Al-Muktafi Billah Shah

References

1930 births
1998 deaths
Mahmud
Malaysian people of Thai descent
Malaysian people of Malay descent
Malaysian Muslims
Mahmud
Mahmud

Mahmud
Mahmud
Mahmud
Mahmud

Second Classes of Royal Family Order of Selangor
First Classes of the Royal Family Order of Johor
Members of the Royal Family Order of Kedah
Recipients of the Order of the Crown of the Realm